East Campus is part of Duke University's campus in Durham, North Carolina. East Campus, along with West Campus, make up most of Duke's main campus. The campus follows the Georgian architecture style, making it distinct from West Campus. Currently, East Campus is the exclusive residential home to first-year students. It borders Trinity Historic District to the east and Walltown Neighborhood to the north.

History 
The first history of Duke University traces back to its founding in 1838 in Trinity, North Carolina. Much to the dislike of the Methodist preachers, under the leadership of the college's President John F. Crowell, Washington Duke made a donation to the college large enough to build a new campus in Durham, North Carolina and move the college.

The new campus was constructed over the course of the last decade of the nineteenth century.

In 1911, the Washington Duke Building was destroyed in a fire. The university created the buildings East Duke and West Duke (not to be confused with East Campus and West Campus) to serve as a replacement with expanded classroom and office space.

In 1938, after the opening of Duke's West Campus for the then all-male undergraduate Trinity College of Arts and Sciences, East Campus became the exclusive campus for Duke's Undergraduate Women's College.

Unlike West Campus, where the campus is surrounded by forest owned by the university, East Campus is surrounded by private property not owned by the university. Thus, much of Duke's development, except for living spaces, has occurred on West Campus.

In 1972, as part of the merging of Duke's Women's College and Duke's Men's Trinity College, the campus became coeducational. Unlike at Harvard University, where the merger between its all-female Radcliffe College and all-male Harvard College took 22 years, the coeducational merger between Duke's undergraduate colleges were merged in a single year.

In 1997, as part of a university-wide change, East Campus became solely the housing for first-year students. This decision was made so that each Duke undergraduate class would feel a sense of connectedness, and it also allows students to better understand the SLG, Greek, or Independent House groups they are eligible to join in the second semester of their first year.

In 2018, Duke opened Trinity Dorm to offset the closings of the historic East and Epworth houses.

First-year Housing 
Unlike that of West Campus, East Campus is not organized into quadrangles, rather it has individual houses and residential halls. Because East Campus is only for first-year students, the campus does not have housing for Selected Living Groups or Greek Organizations. The joining process for these organizations occurs in the spring of an undergraduate's first-year.

Residence Halls 
The Residence Hall concept represents the newer dormitories on East Campus. The dormitories are typically larger than their older "house" counterparts.

 Bell Tower Residence Hall
 Blackwell Residence Hall
 Randolph Residence Hall
 Gilbert-Addoms Residence Hall
 Trinity Residence Hall

Houses 
Although the "house" style dormitories are smaller and older than the newer Residence Halls on West Campus, Duke has recently renovated many of the "houses."

 Epworth House, the oldest structure still in operation at Duke University, originally opened in 1892
 Alspaugh House
 Bassett House
 Brown House
 East House
 Giles House
 West House
 Pegram House
 Southgate House
 Wilson House

Student Union 
First-year students who live on East Campus often eat at the original Trinity College Student Union (commonly called "Marketplace").

Transportation 
The overall shape of Duke University in Durham is bar-bell shaped, with two ends of West Campus and East Campus. Duke provides regular transportation services to connect students between the two campuses (known commonly as the "C1").

See also 

 Duke University West Campus
 Duke University Medical Center
 Talent Identification Program

References 

Duke University
Duke University campus